NFTA may refer to:

 Naphtha Explorations Limited Partnership, ticker symbol in the TA-100 Israeli stockmarket index
 Niagara Frontier Transportation Authority, responsible for public transportation oversight of Erie and Niagara counties in the state of New York
 Nondeterministic finite tree automaton, investigated in theoretical computer science and formal language theory, see Tree automaton#Definitions
 Northern Tasmanian Football Association (1886–1986), a former Australian rules football competition
 Northern Tasmanian Football Association (formed 1996), an Australian rules football competition
 Nuova ferrovia transalpina, Italian name of Switzerland's north–south rail tunnel project NRLA